Sangieta Rao (born 12 December 1973) is an Indian television and film director. Her work as a television director include TV shows like Pavitra Rishta,  Jamai Raja for ZEE TV and Kkusum, Bade Achhe Lagte Hain  for Sony Entertainment Television (India). She won the Best Director award for the Show Bade Achhe Lagte Hain . She is Directing a Marathi film Yes I Can.

Director

Television

Web series

Commercial 

 2 commercial for Gold's gym India

Films

Awards in TV

References

External links 

Indian women television directors
Indian television directors
Indian women film directors
1973 births
Living people
Film directors from Mumbai
21st-century Indian women artists
21st-century Indian film directors
Women artists from Maharashtra